Deep Domain is a science fiction novel by American writerHoward Weinstein, part of the Star Trek: The Original Series franchise.

Plot
Admiral Kirk and the Enterprise visit the ocean-world of Akkalla for diplomatic reasons. Soon Spock and Chekov become lost. A civil war and secrets under the water threaten the entire planet and the Enterprise.

Background
Howard Weinstein previously wrote an episode of Star Trek: The Animated Series  called "The Pirates of Orion."

Weinstein had met with Leonard Nimoy, director of Star Trek IV: The Voyage Home, while Nimoy was developing the story for the film. The two discussed, among other things, the idea of using whales, or creatures similar to whales, something later seen in both that film as well as Deep Domain. Weinstein commented that, "To this day, I don't know if whales ended up in ST:IV partly as a result of my suggestion, or whether they'd already decided that. But they were nice enough to give me that “Thank you” credit". Weinstein drafted a story based on his ideas within a week but the filmmakers were already developing something and so he turned it into the story which became "Deep Domain" instead.

References

External links

Novels based on Star Trek: The Original Series
1987 American novels
American science fiction novels